Koiwat is one of the Ndu languages of Sepik River region of northern Papua New Guinea.

It is spoken in Kamangaui, Koiwat, Paiambit, and Seraba villages of Koiwat ward, Angoram/Middle Sepik Rural LLG, East Sepik Province.

References

Languages of East Sepik Province
Ndu languages